Bae So-hee (born 29 October 1993) is a South Korean sport shooter.

She participated at the 2018 ISSF World Shooting Championships, winning a medal.

References

External links

Living people
1993 births
South Korean female sport shooters
ISSF rifle shooters
20th-century South Korean women
21st-century South Korean women